Federal Signal Corporation is an American manufacturer headquartered in Oak Brook, Illinois. Federal Signal manufactures street sweeper vehicles, public address systems, emergency vehicle equipment, and emergency vehicle lighting.

The company operates two groups: Federal Signal Environmental Solutions and Federal Signal Safety and Security Systems. Federal Signal Environmental Solutions Group manufactures street sweeper vehicles, sewer cleaner and vacuum loader trucks, hydro excavators, waterblasting equipment, dump truck bodies, and trailers. Federal Signal Safety and Security Systems Group manufactures campus alerting systems, emergency vehicle lighting, emergency sirens, alarm systems, outdoor warning sirens, and public address systems.

Currently, the company has 14 manufacturing facilities in 5 different countries.

History
Federal Signal was founded in Chicago, Illinois, as the Federal Electric Company in 1901 by brothers John and James Gilchrist and partner John Goehst, manufacturing and selling store signs lit by incandescent lamps. By 1915, they began manufacturing and selling electrically operated mechanical sirens (such as the Q Siren and the Model 66 Siren). During this time, Federal Electric came under the ownership of Commonwealth Edison, eventually becoming a part of the utility empire of Samuel Insull.

By the 1950s, the company was manufacturing outdoor warning sirens, most notably the Thunderbolt series, primarily intended for warning of air raid attacks or fallout during the Cold War. Many of these sirens have been removed, but some still are operating in tornado siren systems. Longtime engineer Earl Gosswiller patented the Beacon-Ray and TwinSonic products, which were popular emergency vehicle lightbars.

In 1955, the company became a corporation, renaming itself "Federal Sign and Signal Corporation" . By this time, it made outdoor warning sirens, police sirens, fire alarms, and outdoor lighting.

By 1961, Federal Sign and Signal had gone public, trading on the NASDAQ market. This was when new products started being manufactured and sold, such as the Federal Signal Model 2. In 1976, the company became Federal Signal Corporation.

On Feb 22, 2000, Federal Signal Corporation announced the signing of a definitive agreement for the acquisition of P.C.S. Company.

On June 27, 2005, Federal Signal Corporation announced the signing of a joint venture agreement to establish a Chinese company, Federal Signal (Shanghai) Environmental & Sanitary Vehicle Company Limited, based near Shanghai, China.

On February 29, 2016, Federal Signal announced the signing of a definitive agreement for the acquisition of Canada's largest infrastructure-maintenance equipment supplier Joe Johnson Equipment (1), and the rights to the name and company.

On May 8, 2017, Federal Signal announced the acquisition of Truck Bodies and Equipment International (TBEI), making it the owner of six dump body and trailer brands, including Crysteel, Duraclass, Rugby Manufacturing, Ox Bodies, Travis and J-Craft.

On July 2, 2019, Federal Signal completed the acquisition of the assets and operations of Mark Rite Lines Equipment Company, Inc., a manufacturer of road-marking equipment. along with HighMark Traffic Services, Inc., which provides road-marking services in Montana. The signing of the purchase agreement was previously announced on May 14, 2019.

On November 17, 2022, Federal Signal announced the signing of a definitive agreement to acquire substantially all the assets and operations of Blasters, Inc. (“Blasters”), a leading manufacturer of truck-mounted waterblasting equipment, for an initial purchase price of $14 million, subject to post-closing adjustments. In addition, there is a contingent earn-out payment of up to $8 million.

See also
 Rumbler (siren)
 Q2B
 Federal Signal Model 2

References

 Company History - Federal Signal Corp. (Funding Universe)

Companies listed on the New York Stock Exchange
Fire detection and alarm companies
Emergency population warning systems
Sirens
Oak Brook, Illinois
Companies based in DuPage County, Illinois
Emergency services equipment makers
Articles containing video clips